Manfred Kurzer (born 10 January 1970 in West Berlin, West Germany) is a German sports shooter and Olympic champion. He won gold medal in 10 metre running target at the 2004 Summer Olympics in Athens. He placed sixth at the 2000 Summer Olympics. Is currently training soldiers of the army and lives in Frankfurt..

References

 

1970 births
Living people
German male sport shooters
Olympic shooters of Germany
Olympic gold medalists for Germany
Olympic medalists in shooting
Medalists at the 2004 Summer Olympics
Shooters at the 2000 Summer Olympics
Shooters at the 2004 Summer Olympics